Körfez Ulaştırma A.Ş. is an open access railway company operating freight rail service between Körfez, Kocaeli and Kırıkkale in Turkey. The railway carries liquid fuel between the refineries in Körfez and Hacılar (just south of Kırıkkale) on tracks owned by the Turkish State Railways. Körfez Ulaştırma is a wholly owned subsidiary of Tüpraş, the largest liquid-fuel producer in Turkey.

The company ordered 7 diesel/electric hybrid locomotives from Stadler in 2019 and received them in 2021.

References

Transport companies of Turkey
Railway companies established in 2017
Turkish companies established in 2017
Railway companies of Turkey